William Thomas Berger (1815–1899) was a Christian starch manufacturer in London and owner of Samuel Berger & Co., a patent rice starch manufacturer, who became the first home (England) director of the China Inland Mission with James Hudson Taylor in 1865. At this time the headquarters of the mission agency was located at Saint Hill Manor in East Grinstead, England. As the Home Director he was responsible for editing the Occasional Paper of the China Inland Mission and carrying on the work of sending more missionaries to follow Hudson Taylor to China.

At the time of the Yangzhou riot that brought unwelcome notoriety to the mission activity in China, Berger had to defend Taylor and his group from the attacks of the British press. Often, he had to assume this role with little or no knowledge of the current events in China due to the delay in communication with the missionaries overseas.

The Bergers resigned due to failing health and also due to his personal convictions which were similar to Andrew Jukes (in conflict with the traditional Christian principles of the China Inland Mission) regarding the eternal punishment of non-Christians. He remained a faithful supporter of the mission and a friend of Hudson Taylor until his death.

See also
List of China Inland Mission missionaries in China
Christianity in China
Benjamin Broomhall
Historical Bibliography of the China Inland Mission

References

 
 
 
 
 
 

Leaders of Christian parachurch organizations
Christianity in London
Christian writers
English religious leaders
English Protestant missionaries
British Plymouth Brethren
1815 births
1899 deaths